Jón Halldórsson (c. 1275 – 2 February 1339, or Candlemas;) was a Roman Catholic clergyman, who became the bishop of Iceland (1322–1339). He served in the diocese of Skálholt. He grew up in Norway as a friar of the Dominican order and has been assumed to have been of Norwegian birth, though since his mother's name, Freygerðr, is unknown outside Iceland, he may in fact have been (half) Icelandic. He studied both theology in Paris and canon law in Bologna, and his learning is seen as remarkable in contemporary Icelandic sources; Laurentius saga has him as one of Iceland's two best Latinists at his time, as fluent in Latin as in his mother-tongue. He was elected bishop following Grímr Skútuson and consecrated on 1 August 1322 but did not arrive in Iceland until the following year. He was noted for bringing the Icelandic Church more closely into line with canon law and for his skill as a preacher and storyteller; the introduction to Klári saga claims that it is based on a Latin romance discovered by Jón in France, and there is a strong case that Jón indeed produced the saga, while Jón's fame as a gatherer of stories is clear from Laurentius saga. He died in Norway at Candlemass 1339.

See also
List of Skálholt bishops
Jóns þáttr biskups Halldórssonar

References

 Islendzk Aeventyri.; H. Gering, 1882, Vol. II Foreword (German; English translation available through Smashwords ebook purchase (see free sample preview, "translator's notes" for unpublished English translation of H. Gering's life of Jón Halldórsson).

External links

Norwegian Roman Catholic priests
14th-century Roman Catholic bishops in Iceland
1275 births
1339 deaths